Saeger is a German surname that may refer to
Edward Saeger, German-American settler
Edward Saeger House in Crawford County, Pennsylvania, U.S.
Orpheus Saeger Woodward (1835–1919), Union Army officer during American Civil War
Richard Saeger (born 1964), American swimmer

German-language surnames